Berwick is an unincorporated community in Polk County, Iowa, United States, on the east bank of Fourmile Creek. It is part of the Des Moines–West Des Moines Metropolitan Statistical Area.

History
Berwick's population in 1902 was 72, and was 80 in 1925.

In the early 20th century, Berwick and Norwoodville, a mile southwest, were home to several coal mines. Norwood-White shaft No. 2 was half a mile to the east. In 1914, Norwood-White produced over 100,000 tons of coal, ranking among the top 24 coal producers in the state. In 1912, United Mine Workers Local 318 in Berwick had 220 members, and Local 845 in Norwoodville, one mile south, had 129 members.

References 

Unincorporated communities in Polk County, Iowa
Des Moines metropolitan area
Unincorporated communities in Iowa